The World Scrabble Championship 2009 was held in the Zon Regency Hotel, Johor Bahru, Malaysia, between November 26 to November 29.  The tournament format was 24 rounds for all players, followed by best-of-five finals between the top two players. There were 116 places allocated to competitors from around the world, with 108 players eventually competing.

Results

The winner was Pakorn Nemitrmansuk of Thailand who defeated the reigning champion Nigel Richards of New Zealand with three games to one in the best-of-five finals. The two finalists earned their spots by each winning 18 games in the first 24 rounds.  Dave Wiegand of United States won 17 games and placed third.

Pakorn set two additional WSC records at this event, by winning 14 consecutive games in the preliminaries
and by scoring 670 points in a final game, which included a triple-triple of the word PALUDINE scoring 167 points.

The first game was close, Pakorn winning 425-419. Bingos from Pakorn included HOMEWARE, DELEtING and DRENCHING. Bingos from Nigel were STAMINAS and REDEPLOY.

The second game was a record 670-303 win for Pakorn, during which he had a personal best 5:04 remaining on the clock. Pakorn started with the bingo UNRuLES and continued with OORIEST, EBRIATE and the triple-triple PALUDINE. He also had luck with the Z and Q. Nigel chipped in with bingo REAcTOR.

Nigel pulled one back in the third game, 443-394. He had two bingos JINKERS and LICHTED compared to Pakorn's three: REpTANT, STAINED and RAMPAUGE, but Nigel scored more with his (100+ per bingo).

The fourth game saw Pakorn take the title of World Champion at last, after two runner-up positions, in a high scoring and close game 499-480. It was a bingo-bingo start, with Pakorn getting ADVENES and Nigel GRIFTERS. Nigel had a further FrEEHOLD and BOHEMIAN. Pakorn followed up with GENETRIX on the triple and a game winning BOTANICA and BOWATS.

Complete Results

FINALS:
Game 1: Pakorn 425 – Nigel 419
Game 2: Pakorn 670 – Nigel 303
Game 3: Nigel 443 – Pakorn 394
Game 4: Pakorn 499 – Nigel 480

References

External links
Official site

2009
2009 in Malaysian sport
Sport in Johor
Johor Bahru